Kenton is a village and civil parish located near Exeter, the county town of Devon, England. It has one restaurant, a hairdresser, a primary school, a mediaeval church and is near Powderham Castle.

The centre of the village was rebuilt in brick immediately after a fire on 16 April 1856 which destroyed 24 dwellings.

The 14th-century All Saints Church is built of red sandstone with arcades of Beer stone. John Betjeman judged it to be "the full-aisled Devon plan at its best", with a "handsome" tower, and praised the rood screen, which retains ancient colour, and the figure-paintings. The pulpit is medieval; the reredos is by Charles Eamer Kempe. 

Exeter's first woman councillor, Edith Splatt, was born here.

The tower clock, installed in 1900, chimes on the hours and the quarters throughout the day and night; in 2021 it was muffled when Teignbridge Council determined that it exceeded legally permitted noise levels. The adjacent almshouses were built in 1875.

Twin towns
  Saint-Lambert-du-Lattay (France) since 1996
  Linkebeek (Belgium) since 1996

References

External links

 
Villages in Devon
Civil parishes in Devon
Teignbridge